Pompeo Mignucci, O.S.H. (1597–1654) was a Roman Catholic prelate who served as Archbishop (Personal Title) of Acquapendente (1650–1654) and Archbishop of Dubrovnik (1617–1650).

Biography
Pompeo Mignucci was born in Offida, Italy in 1597 and ordained a priest in the Order of Saint Jerome.
On 22 August 1617, he was appointed during the papacy of Pope Paul V as Archbishop of Dubrovnik.
On 29 September 1647, he was consecrated bishop by Marcantonio Franciotti, Cardinal-Priest of Santa Maria della Pace, with Ranuccio Scotti Douglas, Bishop of Borgo San Donnino, and Alessandro Vittrici, Bishop of Alatri, serving as co-consecrators. 
On 10 January 1650, he was appointed during the papacy of Pope Innocent X as Archbishop (Personal Title) of Acquapendente.
He served as Archbishop (Personal Title) of Acquapendente until his death in October 1654.

While bishop, he was the principal co-consecrator of Marin Ibrišimović, Bishop of Beograd (1647).

References

External links and additional sources
 (for Chronology of Bishops) 
 (for Chronology of Bishops) 
 (for Chronology of Bishops) 
 (for Chronology of Bishops)  

17th-century Roman Catholic bishops in Croatia
Bishops appointed by Pope Paul V
Bishops appointed by Pope Innocent X
1597 births
1654 deaths
Hieronymite bishops